Arnica sachalinensis  is an Asian species of flowering plant in the family Asteraceae. It is native to Sakhalin Island on the Pacific Coast of Russia.

Arnica sachalinensis is an herb up to 90 cm tall, spreading by means of underground rhizomes. Flower heads are yellow, with both ray florets and disc florets. It is sometimes cultivated as an ornamental.

References

External links
Henriette's Herbal, Photo: Arnica sachalinensis
Victoria adventure, Gallery of Aquatic & Marginal Plants photo
Giftpflanzen, Sachalin-Wohlverleih (Arnica sachalinensis) in German with photo
Claus M. Passreiter, Günter Willuhn, Horst Weber, Klaus-Jürgen Schleifer. 1999. Tetrahedron 55:2997–3006
Megabook, Арника сахалинская – Arnica sachalinensis (Reg.) A.Gray in Russian

sachalinensis
Flora of the Russian Far East
Plants described in 1883